Syed Mīr Nisār ʿAlī (27 January 1782 – 19 November 1831), better known as Titumir, was a Bengali freedom fighter, who developed a strand of Muslim nationalism coupled with agrarian and political consciousness. He is famed for having built a large bamboo fort to resist the British, which passed onto Bengali folk legend.In 2004, Titumir was ranked number 11 in BBC's poll of the Greatest Bengali of all time.

Early life
Titumir was born Syed Mīr Nisār ʿAlī on 27 January 1782 (14 Magh 1182), in the village of Chandpur (or Haidarpur, per some sources) to Syed Mir Hasan Ali and Abidah Ruqayyah Khatun. The family claimed to be of Arab ancestry, tracing their descent from Caliph Ali. One Syed Shahadat Ali had arrived in Bengal to preach Islam and his son, Syed Abdullah became appointed as the Chief Qadi of Jafarpur by the emperor of Delhi.

Titumir was educated in a local madrassa where he became a hafiz of the Qur'an by the age of twenty, beside being accomplished in Bengali, Arabic, and Persian. He married the daughter of Muhammad Rahimullah Siddiqi, and moved to Calcutta with his wife and teacher Niʿmatullah. Here, he gained patronage under the businessmen Jamaluddin Effendi and Mirza Ghulam Anbiya, furthering his Islamic studies with Shaykh Kamal Bakerganji and Shaykh Zaki Bihari.

He was also a good wrestler and gymnast, leading to an employment-stint as the bodyguard of a local zamindar. However, Titumir was jailed on an occasion and upon release, in 1822, left his job to embark upon Hajj alongside patron Mirza Ghulam Anbiya.

Religio-political activism

Islamic resurgence 
In Mecca, Titu mir was influenced by Syed Ahmad Barelvi, a sufi preacher, who advocated for Jihad to purge all non-Islamic corruptions from sociopolitical life and enforce Sharia. Upon return from Mecca, he began to mobilize the Muslim peasantry by preaching against deviations from Quran —vernacular practices such as the veneration of pirs and constructiion of dargahs, charging of interest on loans etc. were all frowned upon. The Zamindars—who were mostly, Hindu—were held to be in cahoots with the Britishers to oppress their subjects. Titumir's diktats penetrated into the social life, as well: men were to have beards with trimmed moustaches and women adorn burqas; those who did not abide by his diktats were to be boycotted.

The lowest classes of the Muslim society responded favourably; however his emphasis on Islamic fundamentalism meant that there was negligible support from Hindu peasantry. However, the Zamindar community, irrespective of religion, objected to his activities in unison.

Confrontation with zamindars 
In June 1830, Krishnadeva Rai, Zamindar of Purha (var. Talukdar of Sarfarazpur) imposed an annual tax on all Muslim subjects having a beard, to isolate Titumir. On Titu's advice the peasants refused to pay and an enraged Krishnadeva led a bevy of armed men on a spree of arson, after destroying a local mosque. Reciprocal attacks were engaged in but the melee remained inconclusive; complaints were filed at the Baduria Police station by both sides and eventually, the Sub-Divisional Magistrate of Barasat dismissed the issue but only after getting a declaration from the peasants about committing to peace in near-future.

Buoyed up by the evident bias in the resolution of Krishnadeva's case, Ramnarayan Nag Chaudhuri (Zamindar of Taragonia) and Guru Prasad Chowdhury (Talukdar of Nagarpur) began implementing an oppressive tax-regime on their subjects, failing to pay which, led to imprisonment. The peasants organised themselves and sued the Zamindars but to little avail.

These failures led Titu to convert his socio-religious agitation into an aggressive political-economic class-struggle, wherein it was argued that the time was ripe for an all-out armed resistance against the nexus of Zamindars and British Authority.

Confrontations with the British 
Titumir shifted his base from Chandpur to Narkelberia, and began organising an armed militia. In October 1830, one of his declarations proclaimed him (and his followers) to be the natural sovereign of the country, who (rather than the British Authority) had an unilateral right of remittance on local revenues collected by Zamindars; a Muslim landholder was raided in the same month, upon disobeyal. On 31 October, Titumir set to avenge Krishnadeva along with 300 armed followers; his residence was ransacked, establishments of money-lenders in the local market were set on fire, and a cow was sacrificed in front of a temple.

An alliance was soon formed between Zamindars and British Indigo planters to render mutual assistance in case of assaults by Titumir's militia; Kaliprasanna Mukherjee (Zamindar of Habra-Gobardanga) played a key role in the alliance and was soon targeted by Titumir for his illegal tax-regime. Despite being aided by about 200 men of Davies, manager of an Indigo plantation at Mollahati, Kaliprasanna's forces were defeated. Davies escaped narrowly and were sheltered by Debnath Roy (Zamindar of Gobra-Gobindapur); this led to a confrontation between Titumir's militia and Debnath's forces at Laughati in Nadia, where the latter was killed. Several Indigo plantations were subsequently set on fire.

The months of October and November were replete with such cases and the local police proved to be of little use in the face of increasing peasant resistance; many of the Zamindars fled to Kolkata. The Commissioner of Presidency Division was solicited to tackle the situation and accordingly, Alexander, the Joint Magistrate of Barasat (along with Ramram Chakraborti, Officer-In-Charge of Baduria Thana) set out with a force of 120 policemen on 15 November 1830. Outnumbered by a 500-strong militia, they were defeated; Alexander barely escaped to an adjacent village while Ramram (along with 14 others) were battle-casualties.

Self-rule 
Titumir capitalized on the political vacuum and styled him as the Badshah of a large area around Narkelberia, commanding a following of thousands-strong Hindu and Muslim peasants. People loyal to him were installed in official positions (his nephew Ghulam Masum Khan as the Senapati, Muizz ad-Din as the Wazir etc.), and the local Zamindars were compelled to either submit to his rule or vacate the land-holdings.

However, with passage of time, the prospects of an impending conflict with Company forces were inevitable, and he constructed a bamboo-fort (Banser Kella) at Narkelberia. On 17 November 1831, upon receiving instructions from Lord William Bentinck, the-then Governor General of India, Smith, the District Magistrate of Nadia moved towards Narkelberia with four other Magistrates accompanied by a 300 strong armed police force and armed private guards of Zamindars. Golam Masum was aware of this attack and outflanked Smith with a 500-strong militia at Baraghar, north-east of Narkelberia; Smith's forces fled to a planter-residence crossing the Icchamati and urged Lord Bentinck to dispatch a military column.

Final battle 
On the evening of 18 November 1831, a military unit consisting of a cavalry unit and infantry unit (300 armed personnel + two cannons) led by Major Scott, Lieutenant Shakespeare, and Major Sutherland laid a siege on Titumir's fort. Nothing of significance transpired until the morning of 19 November 1831, when a concerted ammunition charge was mounted. The resistance was breached in about three hours, when the fort gave way to cannons.

Titumir was bayoneted to death, as were fifty fellow soldiers. About 800 others were arrested and trialed at Alipur Court; Golam Masum was hanged in front of the fort-ruins to set an example, and about 140 had to serve prison terms of varying lengths. The commanding officer of the British forces noted his opponent's bravery in dispatches, and also commented on the strength and resilience of bamboo as a material for fortification, since he had to pound it with artillery for a surprisingly long time before it gave way.

Contemporary reception 
The newspapers and journals run by Englishmen and Christian Missionaries took the Government-line. Samachar Chandrika, Reformer, Jnananveshan etc. sided with the Zamindars and denounced Titumir as a law-and-order nuisance.

Legacy
In 2004, Titumir was ranked number 11 in BBC's poll of the Greatest Bengali of all time.

Bangladesh
A play-drama Titumir-er Basher Kella, directed by Sheikh Kamal was broadcast in 1967 on Bangladesh Television (then PTV); a graphic novel of the same name was also popular in East Pakistan. In Dhaka, Jinnah College was renamed to Government Titumir College in 1971. On 19 November 1992, the 161st anniversary of his death, the Government of Bangladesh issued a commemorative stamp in his honor. The principal base of Bangladesh Navy is named as 'BNS Titumir'.

India (West Bengal)
Mahasweta Devi wrote a novella Titumir that sought to recover subaltern history. 
In 1978, Utpal Dutt directed an agitprop drama Titumir which critiqued the crude representation of Titumir in colonial historiography; it received critical acclaim and was commercially successful.
In 2021, Theatre activist Joyraj Bhattacharjee is all set to stage Utpal Dutt’s Titumir. Lead Role play by Anirban Bhattacharya.

References

Further reading

 Titumirer Bansher Kella (Bamboo Fort of Titumir, 1981) by Rabeya Khatun

Indian revolutionaries
Rebellions in India
18th-century Bengalis
19th-century Bengalis
Bengali Muslims
19th-century Indian Muslims
Bengal Presidency
People from North 24 Parganas district
1782 births
1831 deaths
Indian independence activists from West Bengal